Oldtown is a city in Bonner County, Idaho and suburb of Newport, Washington, with a population of 184 at the 2010 census. It is located on the Pend Oreille River, just east of Newport. There are no natural or physical barriers, and it is strictly a political division, separated by the straight-line state boundary. Oldtown is squeezed between this boundary to the west and the river to the east, leaving the main business district on U.S. Route 2 with only  of space in which to operate on the Idaho side. Many homes are located in the south end on the other side of the railroad, as the Pend Oreille is somewhat further away here.

History
Originally named Newport, Idaho, the town gradually dwindled, and was renamed and incorporated as "Oldtown" in 1947. In October 2003, a 51-year-old man killed four people at Stateline Tavern in Oldtown, and then committed suicide.

Geography

Demographics

2010 census
At the 2010 census there were 184 people in 80 households, including 47 families, in the city. The racial makup of the city was 98.4% White, 0.5% African American, 0.5% from other races, and 0.5% from two or more races. Hispanic or Latino of any race were 2.7%.

Of the 80 households 35.0% had children under the age of 18 living with them, 32.5% were married couples living together, 18.8% had a female householder with no husband present, 7.5% had a male householder with no wife present, and 41.3% were non-families. 35.0% of households were one person and 10% were one person aged 65 or older. The average household size was 2.30 and the average family size was 2.87.

The median age was 41.1 years. 25% of residents were under the age of 18; 3.8% were between the ages of 18 and 24; 25.4% were from 25 to 44; 30.4% were from 45 to 64; and 15.2% were 65 or older. The gender makeup of the city was 49.5% male and 50.5% female.

2000 census
At the 2000 census there were 190 people in 81 households, including 46 families, in the city. The racial makup of the city was 93.68% White, 3.16% Native American, and 3.16% from two or more races. Hispanic or Latino of any race were 2.11%.

Of the 81 households 27.2% had children under the age of 18 living with them, 42.0% were married couples living together, 12.3% had a female householder with no husband present, and 42.0% were non-families. 34.6% of households were one person and 12.3% were one person aged 65 or older. The average household size was 2.35 and the average family size was 3.00.

The age distribution was 26.8% under the age of 18, 8.9% from 18 to 24, 30.0% from 25 to 44, 18.9% from 45 to 64, and 15.3% 65 or older. The median age was 38 years. For every 100 females, there were 91.9 males. For every 100 females age 18 and over, there were 80.5 males.

The median household income was $23,542 and the median family income was $23,125. Males had a median income of $26,250 versus $10,625 for females. The per capita income for the city was $11,893. About 21.6% of families and 22.4% of the population were below the poverty line, including 23.5% of those under the age of eighteen and 6.3% of those sixty five or over.

See also
 List of cities in Idaho

References

External links

Cities in Bonner County, Idaho
Cities in Idaho